Tritia denticulata is a species of sea snail, a marine gastropod mollusk in the family Nassariidae, the Nassa mud snails or dog whelks.

Description
The length of the shell varies between 20 mm and 35 mm. The shell has a high conical spire and a globose body whorl. The protoconch is cyrtoconoid (almost with the shape of a cone, but having convex sides) with about 3 whorls. The teleoconch contains 7–8 convex whorls, with a sculpture of fine, regular spiral cords, broader than the interspaces, and with flexuous axial folds, which are rather swollen beneath the suture and make it undulated and channelled. The base of the body whorl contains a strong groove delimiting the outer part of the siphonal canal. The aperture is rounded. The outer lip is somewhat thickened externally although not forming a varix. Inside the outer lip there are numerous denticles elongated in the spiral direction and alternating stronger and weaker. Parietal and columellar edges form a callus with a raised edge. There is a distinct parietal plait present. The colour of the shell is yellowish with a broad subsutural band of darker blotches; the protoconch dark brown; and the aperture white.

Distribution
This species occurs in the Eastern Atlantic, from southern Portugal to Angola, also off the Cape Verde islands, Canary Islands, Madeira and Lusitanian seamounts. It occurs in the Mediterranean Sea only in the Alboran Sea and off the Algerian coast. It is moderately common in 50–200 m. Gorringe, Ampère and Seine seamounts, rare in 130–310 m.

References

 Cernohorsky W. O. (1984). Systematics of the family Nassariidae (Mollusca: Gastropoda). Bulletin of the Auckland Institute and Museum 14: 1–356
 Adam W. & Knudsen J. 1984. Révision des Nassariidae (Mollusca : Gastropoda Prosobranchia) de l’Afrique occidentale. Bulletin de l'Institut Royal des Sciences Naturelles de Belgique 55(9): 1–95, 5 pl
 Rolán E. & Hernández J.M. (2005) The West African species of the group Nassarius denticulatus (Mollusca, Neogastropoda), with the description of a new species. Journal of Conchology 38(5): 499-511 page(s): 500

External links
 

denticulata
Gastropods described in 1852
Molluscs of the Atlantic Ocean
Molluscs of the Mediterranean Sea
Molluscs of Angola
Molluscs of the Canary Islands
Molluscs of Madeira
Gastropods of Cape Verde
Invertebrates of North Africa
Molluscs of Europe